Lysov is a rural locality (a khutor) and the administrative center of Lysovskoye Rural Settlement, Surovikinsky District, Volgograd Oblast, Russia. The population was 371 as of 2010. There are 8 streets.

Geography 
Lysov is located on the left bank of the Liska River, 31 km ENE of Surovikino (the district's administrative centre) by road. Zryanin is the nearest rural locality.

References 

Rural localities in Surovikinsky District